JWH-359 is a dibenzopyran "classical" cannabinoid drug, which is a potent and selective CB2 receptor agonist, with a Ki of 13.0 nM and selectivity of around 220 times for CB2 over CB1 receptors. It is related to other dibenzopyran CB2 agonists such as JWH-133 and L-759,656 but with a chiral side chain which has made it useful for mapping the shape of the CB2 binding site. It was discovered by, and named after, John W. Huffman.

References 

JWH cannabinoids
Benzochromenes
Phenol ethers
Methoxy compounds